The 2013 Lamar Hunt U.S. Open Cup tournament proper features teams from all five tiers of men's soccer of the American soccer pyramid.

For the 2013 tournament, all American-based teams from the top two tiers, Major League Soccer and the North American Soccer League, will earns berths into the third and second round propers of the tournament, respectively.

For the third, fourth and fifth tiers of the pyramid, a series of qualification and state tournaments are held to determine the berths into the tournament. Most states began their qualification in October or November 2012 and will conclude in March 2013. These teams will complete the 64-team field in the U.S. Open Cup.

League

National Premier Soccer League 

In addition to the two teams from the West qualifying tournament, the following NPSL teams also qualified:

Chattanooga FC, 2012 Southeast Division playoff champion
FC Sonic Lehigh Valley, 2012 Keystone Division champion
Georgia Revolution, 2012 Southeast Division playoff finalist
Madison 56ers, 2012 Central Division champion
New York Red Bulls U-23, 2012 Atlantic Division champion

The Erie Admirals, 2012 Great Lakes Division regular season champions, were expected to join but declined citing a variety of reasons. AFC Cleveland as the division's playoff champion was next in line but also declined. Rather than giving the Open Cup berth to the division's third choice, Detroit City FC, they awarded the berth to the club that had the best overall record among the remaining teams league wide (excluding Western Conference), which was the Brooklyn Italians.

NPSL Western Conference Northern Division Qualifying Tournament

All five teams of the 2013 Northern Division competed in the qualifying tournament with Real San Jose, San Francisco Stompers, and Sonoma County Sol receiving first round byes.

Matches

NPSL Western Conference Southern Division Qualifying Tournament

All six teams of the 2013 Southern Division competed in the qualifying tournament with FC Santa Clarita and San Diego Flash receiving first round byes.

 Orange County Spartans forfeited due to improper player registration
 Las Vegas Stallions forfeited due to improper player registration

Matches

USASA 
The top 2 finishers in each region will qualify directly to the U.S. Open Cup tournament proper.

Region I 

 Massachusetts Premier Soccer
 Icon FC

Region II 

 RWB Adria
 Dearborn Stars

Region III 

 Red Force FC
 NTX Rayados

Region IV 

 Doxa Italia
 PSA Elite

US Club Soccer 

The USCS qualifying tournament consists of 2 groups with the top two finishers moving on to a single elimination bracket, with the winner qualifying for the 2013 U.S. Open Cup play-in round.

Group A

Group B

Knock-Out Round

+ The San Ramon SC/Los Gatos Storm semifinal was suspended 1–1 in extra time due to a power failure which caused the lights to go out at the stadium. The match was replayed on April 21.

References

External links
 U.S. Soccer Federation
 TheCup.us - Unofficial U.S. Open Cup News 

 
U.S. Open Cup